Virtuality is a line of virtual reality gaming machines produced by Virtuality Group, and found in video arcades in the early 1990s. The machines deliver real time (less than 50ms latency) gaming via a stereoscopic visor, joysticks, and networked units for multi-player gaming.

Following Dr. Jonathan D Waldern's VR PhD research (1985–1990) and  supported by IBM Research Labs, Virtuality Group was formed in 1985 as a startup called W Industries. Waldern's earlier work at Leicester Polytechnic's Human Computer Interface Research Unit had produced a computer system featuring "no less than five 16- and 32-bit microcomputers" that could produce a stereoscopic view of a three-dimensional scene, viewed on a screen using special headgear featuring an active shutter system, with head and hand tracking using "sonic sensors" to determine the viewer's position. Waldern's company developed many of the principal components including VR headsets, graphics subsystems, 3D trackers, exoskeleton data gloves and other enclosure designs. Fully developed by 1990, the VR integrated systems were launched at a computer graphics show at Crystal Palace and marketed to industry. The first two networked VR systems were sold to British Telecom Research Laboratories to experiment with networked telepresence applications. Many other systems were sold to corporations including Ford, IBM, Mitsubishi and Olin. Professional virtual reality systems included: a virtual reality attraction created by Creative Agency Imagination for the launch of the 1995 Ford Galaxy and a virtual trading floor for the London International Financial Futures and Options Exchange  (LIFFE).

There are two types of units (referred to by the company as "pods"): One where the player stands up (SU), and the other where they sit down (SD). Both unit types utilize virtual reality headsets (the "Visette") which each contain two LCD screens at resolutions of 276x372 each. Four speakers and a microphone were also built into the unit. The SU units have a Polhemus 'Fast Track' magnetic source built into the waist high ring with a receiver in a free-moving joystick (the "Space Joystick"), while the SD design has the player sitting down with joysticks, a steering wheel, or aircraft yoke for control, depending on the game. The SD system was developed and launched in 1993 at Wembley Stadium in London.

Using the magnetic tracking system the stereoscopic display was able to react to head movements to change the display based on what the player would be "looking at" within the gaming environment. The position of the joystick (also magnetically tracked) controls movement of the player's "virtual hand", and a button on the joystick moves the player forwards in the game arena.

1000 Series
Introduced in October 1991, and powered by an Amiga 3000, the 1000CS and 1000SD have a distinctive helmet comprising a brightly coloured front panel with 'VIRTUALITY' embossed across it.

1000CS games
 Dactyl Nightmare – Multiplayer map with several levels and platforms; grenade launcher weapons and pterodactyl enemy.
 Grid Busters – Robot shoot-em-up.
 Hero – Locked door puzzle.
 Legend Quest – Fantasy adventure.

1000SD games
 Battlesphere – Space battle.
 Exorex – Robot warriors.
 Total Destruction – Stock car racing.
 VTOL – A Harrier jump jet simulator.
 Flying Aces – A biplane dogfight simulator.

Virtuality's release surprised the existing VR industry. Despite crude graphics, it offered what Computer Gaming World in 1992 described as "all the necessary hallmarks of a fully immersive system at what, to many, is a cheap price. The main complaint ... has so far been its lack of resolution and software support".

2000 Series
The 2000SU and SD models were introduced in 1994, powered by an Intel 486-PC and using Motorola 88110 processors for graphics rendering. They have several more games including Buggy Ball, Dactyl Nightmare 2 - Race For The Eggs!, Zone Hunter and Pac-Man VR.

There was also a 3000 series, which was basically a 2000 Series machine upgraded with faster processor (Intel Pentium) and a rifle-type controller. They were offered in 2 versions, a "normal" SU-3000 with a generic rifle-type controller and a "Total Recoil" version with an official Winchester Replica Rifle-type controller that featured a -powered blowback mechanism. The "Total recoil" Version came with the game package "Quickshot Carnival" which featured Clay shooting and other target practice. The "normal" generic-rifle version came with the game "Zero Hour", which was a first-person shooter "on rails" that was tailor-made for the gun controller.

Project Elysium

Virtuality also worked to use their VR technology for more practical purposes. Project Elysium was a virtual reality system developed in 1995 by Virtuality for IBM for use in architectural and construction applications to give builders and clients an idea of how things would look once they were built, among other uses. It was a "complete integrated VR workstation with development software" and it included a visette and hand-held control device called the "V-Flexor. It has created a high way gaming."

Company
Developer W. Industries (named after its founder Dr. Jonathan D. Waldern), later renamed Virtuality Group Plc, was founded in 1987. The company was backed by Lord Wolfson of Wembly Group Plc, who with Apax Venture Capital company were majority shareholders. There were five group subsidiaries. In 1997, rights to the entertainment machines (but not the Virtuality brand) were sold to CyberMind UK in a breakup of the group owing to a dramatic slump in demand for the expensive (then $65,000) theme park and Arcade machines, causing the manufacturing division's (called Virtuality Entertainment) insolvency. Thereafter CyberMind UK was sold to Arcadian Virtual Reality LLC in 2004. In Australia, Fun City Entertainment Complex in Sunshine, Melbourne Victoria is the only venue in Australia running the SU 2000 models and is an agent for the sale and support of the Virtuality entertainment systems. During the company sale, Dr Waldern purchased all IP consumer technology rights, in addition to all Virtuality brand rights other than entertainment machines. In 1996 he launched a consumer VR display in partnership with Takara, and another in 1998 with Philips Electronics (under the brand name "Scuba"). Combined, over 55,000 headsets were sold, mostly in Japan.

The company is currently working on next generation optoelectronics technology and applications including applications for Virtual Reality.

References

External links
 Owner of Virtuality Brand, Technology and new Product Development
 Virtuality (Internet Archive)
 Arcadian Virtual Reality LLC—the current owner of Virtuality SU, SD & CS Arcade Machines
 Arcade History—where all the above games can be found
 Cybermind—Overview of the different systems
 Reality Crumbles: Whatever happened to VR?
 The Story of Virtuality (YouTube)

1991 video games
Arcade video games
Arcade-only video games
Dinosaurs in video games
First-person shooters
Products introduced in 1991
Video games developed in the United States
Virtual reality
Virtual reality headsets
Virtual reality games